The squads for the 2017 Africa U-20 Cup of Nations were announced on 24 February 2017.

Players marked in bold have been capped at full International level.

Cameroon
Head coach: Cyprien Asshu Bessong

Egypt
Head coach: Moatamed Gamal Abdelaziz

Guinea
Head coach:

Mali
Head coach: Baye Ba

Senegal
Head coach: Joseph Koto

South Africa
Head coach:  Thabo Senong

Sudan
Head coach: Mubark Suliman Mohamed Slaih

Zambia
Head coach: Bestone Chambeshi

References

2017 Africa U-20 Cup of Nations
Africa U-20 Cup of Nations squads